The 2021–22 season is Rochdale's 115th year in their history and first season back in League Two since the 2013–14 season following relegation last season. Along with the league, the club will also compete in the FA Cup, the EFL Cup and the EFL Trophy. The season covers the period from 1 July 2021 to 30 June 2022.

Manager changes
On 30 June, Dale announced they reluctantly agreed to release manager Brian Barry-Murphy from his contract.

Robbie Stockdale was appointed as the new manager on July 10, signing a two-year contract with the club.

First-team squad

Statistics

	

 

 

  

|}

Goals record

Disciplinary record

Pre-season friendlies
Rochdale announced they would play friendly matches against Luton Town, Barnsley, Fleetwood Town, Rotherham United, AFC Fylde and Stalybridge Celtic as part of their pre-season preparation.

Competitions

League Two

League table

Results summary

Results by matchday

Matches
Dale's fixtures were announced on 24 June 2021.

FA Cup

Rochdale were drawn at home to Notts County in the first round and Plymouth Argyle in the second round.

EFL Cup

Rochdale were drawn away to Harrogate Town in the first round Shrewsbury Town in the second round and Burnley in the third round.

EFL Trophy

Rochdale were drawn into Northern Group D alongside Bolton Wanderers, Liverpool U21s and Port Vale. The dates for the group stage fixtures were revealed on July 8.

Transfers

Transfers in

Loans in

Loans out

Transfers out

References

Rochdale
Rochdale A.F.C. seasons